Osman Resul Taka (died 1887) was a Cham Albanian dancer and unclear personage from 19th century. The Dance of Osman Taka is named after him. His early life is not clear. He belongs to the  Taka clan of Filiates, also known for Alush Taka, an Albanian patriot. 
According to narrative sources, his name became well-known during the mid 19th century. He was probably a kachak or klepht fighting the Ottomans in Chameria region. Other sources connect him with the Albanian National Awakening of late 19th century. He was jailed in Yanina and was sentenced to death. When he was asked to give his final wish, he wanted to dance. The folk tradition says that his dance was so beautiful that the local Albanian gendarmes of the Ottoman army, did not execute him. After some days he was caught again and was killed in Konispol.

References

1887 deaths
People from Konispol
Cham Albanians
19th-century Albanian people
19th-century people from the Ottoman Empire
Year of birth unknown
19th-century dancers